Thomas James Mottram (7 September 1945 – 26 July 2019) was an English first-class cricketer. He was a right-handed batsman who bowled right-arm medium pace. His appearances in first-class cricket were restricted by his profession as a school teacher.

Mottram first represented the Lancashire Second XI in two matches in the 1970 Minor Counties Championship against Cumberland and Yorkshire Second XI.

Six feet four inches tall, Mottram joined Hampshire in 1971, making his debut in a List-A match against Somerset. He made his first-class debut in 1972 against the touring Australians. His County Championship debut came against Worcestershire at the United Services Recreation Ground in Portsmouth.

Mottram was a part of Hampshire's 1973 County Championship winning team, where he starred with the ball taking 57 wickets at an average of 22.00, including career best figures of 6-63. His performances and personality made him a cult figure at the club.

Mottram played most of his cricket for Hampshire in the one-day form of the game, playing in 83 matches, the last of which came in 1977 against Kent. Mottram took 135 wickets at the brilliant average of 18.69 with career best figures of 5-21.

In 1976 Mottram's first-class career came to an end, with his final match against Derbyshire. Mottram, a poor batsman, did not excel in either form of the game with the bat, averaging under six in both forms. But his bowling was reliable in first-class cricket, taking 111 wickets at an average of 24.11.

At the end of the 1977 County Championship Mottram left Hampshire. He died in July 2019.

References

External links
Thomas Mottram at Cricinfo
Thomas Mottram at CricketArchive
Matches and detailed statistics for Thomas Mottram

1945 births
2019 deaths
English cricketers
Hampshire cricketers
Cricketers from Liverpool